Handu pumpulla is a Finnish television series. It aired on Finnish TV in 2005.

See also
List of Finnish television series

External links
 

Finnish television shows
2005 Finnish television series debuts
2005 Finnish television series endings
2000s Finnish television series
Nelonen original programming